Kirkoswald is a civil parish in the Eden District, Cumbria, England. It contains 57 listed buildings that are recorded in the National Heritage List for England. Of these, one is listed at Grade I, the highest of the three grades, seven are at Grade II*, the middle grade, and the others are at Grade II, the lowest grade.  The parish contains the village of Kirkoswald, the smaller village of Renwick, and the surrounding countryside.  The listed buildings include a castle, now in ruins, two tower houses, one that developed into a country house, and the other into a farmhouse, and buildings formerly associated with a collegiate church.  Most of the other listed buildings consist of houses and associated structures, farmhouses and farm buildings.  Included in the other listed buildings are churches, a separate bell tower, hotels and public houses, shops, village stocks, a bridge, a former water mill, a bank, a manorial boundary stone, a war memorial, and a telephone kiosk.


Key

Buildings

References

Citations

Sources

Lists of listed buildings in Cumbria
Listed buildings